Clemens Unterweger (born 1 April 1992) is an Austrian professional ice hockey defenceman playing for EC KAC of the ICE Hockey League (ICEHL).

References

External links

1992 births
Austrian ice hockey defencemen
Graz 99ers players
EC KAC players
Living people
People from Lienz
Sportspeople from Tyrol (state)